Gurrumul is a 2018 Australian documentary film about the life of Geoffrey Gurrumul Yunupingu. the film premiered at the Berlin Film Festival in February 2018 to positive reviews. The film was released in Australia on 26 April 2018.

Background
Celebrated by audiences at home and abroad, indigenous artist Geoffrey Gurrumul Yunupingu was one of the most important and acclaimed voices to ever come out of Australia. Blind from birth, he found purpose and meaning through songs and music inspired by his community and country on Elcho Island in far North East Arnhem Land. Living a traditional Yolngu life, his breakthrough album Gurrumul brought him to a crossroads as audiences and artists around the world began to embrace his music.

Director Paul Williams became the in-house filmmaker at Skinnyfish Music, Gurrumul's Darwin-based record label in 2012, and came up with the idea to make the documentary. Williams said "I really wanted to show the difficulty that an indigenous person from a remote traditional community has interfacing with the white, balanda, world. In particular interfacing with the expectation of celebrity, the expectation of fame and the expectations of what was rapidly becoming an international music career." adding "I'd really love it to be on school curriculum after the theatrical release is done because the kind of conversations that can be had around this film, and its central themes about Australia, about the future of this country, about the future of race relations, I think is really important."

Reception
Gurrumul was met with positive reviews from critics and audiences, sitting on 8.9/10 on the Internet Movie Database.

Luke Buckmaster from The Guardian gave the film 4.5 out of 5, saying "Core to the film is the question of what it means to be an Indigenous Australian in the modern world." He added: "For Gurrumul fans, the film is obviously a must-see. For those unfamiliar, or vaguely familiar with his work, it’s an even greater treat: they will be entertained, enthralled, perhaps in some small way changed."

Stephanie Bunbury from The Sydney Morning Herald said "Gurrumul was blind from birth but... he could play any instrument he picked up. He played with Yothu Yindi, then with his own group Saltwater Band before releasing a self-titled solo album in 2008.... He won ARIA Awards; he played for the Queen and for Barack Obama, continuing all the while to live on Elcho Island, hunting and fishing. The film makes it clear this wasn't always an easy mix."

In 2019, the film won a Grand Jury Special Prize (Prix Spécial du Jury) at the FIFO film festival in Tahiti.

References

External links

Gurrumul on Rotten Tomatoes

2018 films
Australian documentary films
2010s English-language films
2010s Australian films